Julian Scherner (September 23, 1895 – April 28, 1945) was a Nazi Party official and a high-ranking member in the SS of Nazi Germany. During World War II, he served as the SS and Police Leader of Kraków, Germany-occupied Poland.

Early life

Julian Scherner was born on September 23, 1895 in the town of Bagamoyo in German East Africa, where he lived until the age of two. Scherner attended the cadet schools, Kadettenanstalt, Karlsruhe between October 1, 1905 and 1911 and Berlin-Lichterfield between 1911 and 1914. Scherner was enlisted in the infantrie rgt. 114 between March 15, 1912 and August 10, 1914. During this time, Scherner earned the rank of Fähnrich in April 1914 and received officer rank on August 5, 1914. In 1914, he joined the Reichsheer or Imperial army. Scherner served in World War 1 as a Zugführer, Kompanieführer, company commander and platoon leader. Scherner was injured by shell splinters and rifle fire in the ankle and head respectively and was hospitalized between 1914-1915. After Scherner was released from the hospital, in 1915, he returned to his military unit but was captured by the French in May 1915. Scherner was awarded the Iron Cross second class and the Wound Badge in black and subsequently discharged from the military on March 30, 1920 with the rank of Oberleutnant.

After retiring from the military in 1920, he joined the Freikorps Oberland. Following the war, Scherner worked as a bank clerk from 1920 until 1924, then as a shop assistant until 1930 and after that as a partner in a merchant’s business until 1934.

Scherner married Rosita S (born May 1, 1899) on May 1, 1924. Scherner and his wife had two children. In 1923, Scherner took part in the Hitler-Ludendorff Putsch and was ultimately injured and arrested following the failure and ensuing chaos.

SS career 
Scherner joined the SS on December 28, 1932 and became a salaried SS officer in June 1934. Scherner commanded the SS training camp at Dachau between October 1937 and March 1940. Scherner eventually relocated to the SS Officer School at Bad Tölz. From September 1939 to 11 November 1939 he was regimental commander of the SS-Gebirgsjäger-Regiment 11 "Reinhard Heydrich". From summer to the winter of 1940, he was commander of the 8 Totenkopf-Standarte. As an SS garrison commander of Prague, between January to September 1941, Scherner supervised preparations for the establishment of a Waffen-SS training camp at Beneschau, Bohemia. On 4 August 1941, Scherner was appointed SS and Police Leader in German-occupied Kraków.

Early corruption 
Scherner was a close acquaintance of Oberscharführer Heinz Klare, meeting with him on numerous occasions. Scherner aided Klare in receiving extended work leave and enabled Klare’s entry into the Waffen SS while also guaranteeing Klare sick leave for a heart problem. Klare joined Scherner’s staff as ordnance officer and on December 15, 1941 became Scherner's personal adjutant. Scherner borrowed money numerous times from Klare personally and from Klare’s expense account, in violation of standing orders, over the course of 1941-1942. Klare and Scherner were condemned for living indecently and for possession of illegal food and spirits. The following investigation resulted in Klare’s arrest for possible involvement in black market dealings. Klare alleged that Scherner owed him money and had embezzled food stuffs and inappropriately used his service vehicle. The investigation yielded little punishment for Scherner. However, Scherner was reprimanded by the Reichsführer, Himmler, for his luxurious lifestyle. Himmler gave Scherner a serious warning and then tasked the court with investigating Scherner’s dealings. SS-Obergruppenführer Fredrich- Wilhelm Krüger, an acquaintance of Scherner's since childhood, asserted confidence in Scherner saying "[Scherner] is very companionable and helpful towards everyone. He gets close very quickly to every person, but unfortunately does not possess the ability to recognise [sic] and comply with the prescribed boundaries that apply to him in his official position towards subordinates." The judge decided Scherner had inappropriately abused his resources as well as helped Klare avoid the draft. The judge further concluded that Scherner had not been a party to military corruption and did not find Scherner's actions worthy of a court punishment. Scherner was sentenced to 14 days of, Stubenarrest, house arrest but this punishment was postponed until after the war and ultimately never imposed.

Destruction of the Krakow ghetto 
Scherner along with Richard Wendler, were supportive of the murder and deporting of Jews as the "solution to the Jewish question". On May 28–29, 1942, Scherner began deportations from Krakow. Police battalions, commanded by Scherner, encircled the ghetto and announced all Jews were to required to register and would be killed if they did not comply. After the initial deportation, in May 1942, Scherner began an extensive murder campaign against the Jews within his jurisdiction. The murder operation moved through Tarnow, Rzeszow, Debica, Przemsylm Jaroslau Jaslo, Krosno, Nowy Sacz, Novy Targ, Sanok and Miechow. Tarnow became the location for numerous mass shootings, the victims of which number approximately 10,000. In June 1942, 6,000 Jews from the Tarnow ghetto including men, women, children and hundreds of orphan children were murdered.

Although, the exact date is unclear, the official agreement to build the Płaszów concentration camp was likely in the fall of 1942. Scherner gave orders regarding the construction of Płaszów, appointed the camp officers, was responsible for important camp matters and personally visited the camp. In November 1942, Scherner ordered all employed Jews to be congregated into forced labor camps. In 1943, Scherner gave orders to further isolate the working Jews. This was done as a preventative measure after Jewish rebellions.

Scherner was responsible for the deportations to the Bełżec extermination camp, the mass shootings in Tarnów and all 'evacuations' that took place during his time there - including Aktion Krakau. He liquidated Kraków Ghetto by deporting its inhabitants to Auschwitz.

His position afforded him a great deal of authority in many areas, as the title of SS and Police Leader was conferred to high-ranking Nazi Party members, reporting directly to Himmler's deputy. Like Amon Göth, Scherner was far too interested in the confiscated goods from the Płaszów camp. Scherner was transferred to Dachau in April 1944 and appeared before an SS Court (the dreaded Hauptamt SS-Gericht) on 16 October 1944. As a result, Scherner was demoted from SS-Oberführer der Reserve in the Waffen-SS to SS-Hauptsturmführer der Reserve and transferred to the Dirlewanger Brigade (formally the 36th Waffen Grenadier Division of the SS) under SS-Oberführer Dr. Oskar Dirlewanger.

He was found dead shortly before the war ended in a wooded area near Niepołomice in southern Poland, under unknown circumstances.

References 

1895 births
1945 deaths
People from Bagamoyo District
Tanzanian people of German descent
Nazi Party politicians
Holocaust perpetrators in Poland
Nazi Party officials
SS and Police Leaders
SS-Oberführer
Recipients of the Iron Cross (1914), 2nd class
Waffen-SS personnel
German Army personnel of World War I
German people in German East Africa